The 2021 Sacred Heart Pioneers football team represented Sacred Heart University as a member of the Northeast Conference (NEC) in the 2021 NCAA Division I FCS football season. The Pioneers, led by ninth-year head coach Mark Nofri, played their home games at Campus Field.

Schedule

References

Sacred Heart
Sacred Heart Pioneers football seasons
Northeast Conference football champion seasons
2021 NCAA Division I FCS playoff participants
Sacred Heart Pioneers football